G. fimbriata may refer to:

Girella fimbriata, a fish species
Gonionota fimbriata, a moth species